Gymnastics at the Friendship Games was contested in two disciplines. Artistic gymnastics was held in Olomouc, Czechoslovakia, between 20 and 26 August 1984, with 14 events (8 men's and 6 women's). Rhythmic gymnastics was held in Sofia, Bulgaria, between 17 and 19 August 1984, with 5 events (all of them women's).

In the women's artistic all-around competition, Olga Mostepanova made history by becoming the first gymnast ever to be awarded a perfect 40.000 total score. With the abolition of the perfect-10 scoring system in 2006 in favor of open-ended scoring, it is very unlikely that any other elite gymnast will match Mostepanova's accomplishment.

Artistic gymnastics

Men's events

Women's events

Men's artistic

Team final

All-around final

Floor exercise

Pommel horse

Rings

Vault

Parallel bars

Horizontal bar

Women's artistic

Team final

All-around final

Vault

Uneven bars

Balance beam

Floor exercise

Rhythmic gymnastics

Medal table

See also
 Gymnastics at the 1984 Summer Olympics

References

 

Friendship Games
Friendship Games
Friendship Games
Friendship Games
Friendship Games
1984 in Bulgarian sport
1984 in Czechoslovak sport

ru:Соревнования «Дружба-84» по художественной гимнастике